Diorygma fuscum is a species of corticolous (bark-dwelling) crustose lichen in the family Graphidaceae. Found in China, it was formally described as a new species in 2016 by Jian Li and Ze-Feng Jia. The specific epithet fuscum ("brown") refers to the lichen's mature ascospores, which are brownish in colour. Secondary chemicals that occur in the lichen include stictic acid (major), and minor to trace amounts of constictic acid, hypostictic acid, and hypoconstictic acid. The presence of stictic acid helps distinguish this species from the similar Diorygma pruinosum.

References

fuscum
Lichen species
Lichens described in 2016
Lichens of China